The 2021–22 Samford Bulldogs men's basketball team represented Samford University in the 2021–22 NCAA Division I men's basketball season. The Bulldogs, led by second-year head coach Bucky McMillan, played their home games at the Pete Hanna Center in Homewood, Alabama as a member of the Southern Conference. They finished the season 21–11, 10–8 in SoCon play to finish in a tie for third place. As the No. 3 seed in the SoCon tournament, they defeated UNC Greensboro before losing to Furman in the semifinals.

Previous season
In a season limited due to the ongoing COVID-19 pandemic, the Bulldogs finished the 2020–21 season 6–13, 2–9 in SoCon play to finish in last place. They lost to Mercer in the first round of the SoCon tournament.

Roster

Schedule and results

|-
!colspan=12 style=| Non-conference regular season

|-
!colspan=12 style=| SoCon regular season

|-
!colspan=9 style=| SoCon tournament

Sources

References

Samford Bulldogs men's basketball seasons
Samford Bulldogs
Samford Bulldogs men's basketball
Samford Bulldogs men's basketball